Bledi Shkëmbi (born 13 August 1979) is an Albanian professional football coach and former player.

A former Albanian international, he has previously played for Ethnikos Asteras in Greece, Rijeka and Kamen Ingrad in Croatia, Metalurh Zaporizhzhia and Kryvbas in Ukraine as well as Teuta Durrës, Partizani Tirana and Besa Kavajë in Albania.

Club career

Early career
Shkëmbi joined his local side Skënderbeu Korçë as an 11-year-old and progressed through the youth ranks before eventually being promoted to the senior side ahead of the 1997–98 season. He immediately became a first team player as an 18-year-old, featuring in 31 league games out of a possible 34, and scoring one goal in the process to help his side finish 11th in the league out of 18 teams. The following season was similar for Shkëmbi as he was an important player in the club's midfield as they finished just 2 points above the relegation zone as he played 24 league games and scored twice. He then made 25 appearances out of a possible 26 in the league during the 1999–00 season and scored once in a 7–0 thrashing of Apolonia Fier. He was then allowed to search for a new club and leave on a free transfer.

He joined Teuta Durrës ahead of the 2000–01 season, and his first game for the club was the 2000 Albanian Supercup against KF Tirana, playing the full 90 minutes in the 1–0 loss. In the league he made 21 appearances and scored once, against Tomori Berat, as his side finished 6th with his former side Skënderbeu Korçë finishing bottom and being relegated to the Albanian First Division. He was part of the Teuta Durrës side that reached the final of the Albanian Cup during the 2000–01 season, as he scored against Naftëtari Kuçovë in the first round, before starting the final against KF Tirana who beat Teuta Durrës as they had done before the season started in the Albanian Supercup, this time 5–0. He made his European debut with Teuta Durrës on 10 August 2001 in a UEFA Cup second qualifying round game against Rapid Vienna, starting in the 2–0 loss as he was substituted in the 82nd minute for Erion Matraku. He also started the return leg but his side lost 4–0. He then left the club following their short lived UEFA Cup run, as his contract ran out.

Besa Kavajë

In January 2010, Shkembi signed with Besa Kavajë on an 18 months contract with an option to renew for another year after the expiration of it. During the second part of 2009–10 season, he played 12 matches, scoring twice in the process. He left the club after the end of the season, he and Alban Dragusha were excluded by the coach Shpëtim Duro ahead of the European clash against Olympiacos.

Skënderbeu Korçë

In July 2010, he and Alban Dragusha were signed by Skënderbeu Korçë. His return was strongly required by the club's fans.

At the end of 2011–12 season, in which Shkëmbi contributed with 36 appearances and 10 goals in all competitions, he was presented Fair Play Award.

On 19 August 2015, in the first leg of play-off round of 2015–16 UEFA Champions League against Dinamo Zagreb at Elbasan Arena, Shkëmbi scored the opener in the 37th minute with a free kick, but it was not enough as Dinamo Zagreb reacted and won the match 2–1.

On 18 May, Shkëmbi officially retired from professional football at the age of 36, ending his nineteen-year career by lifting the club's six consecutive league title.

International career

He has been a former international player of Albania from 2001 to 2006, during which he collected 14 matches without scoring a goal. He was called by the coach of that time Sulejman Demollari to participate at Tournament Bahrain where he made 3 appearances, all of them as a substitute.

Managerial career

Liria
On 16 June 2017, Shkëmbi begun his managerial career as he was appointed manager of Football Superleague of Kosovo outfit Liria. He signed a contract for the 2017–18 season. Later on 2 March 2018, he handed a resignation request due to presidency change in the club. Following the 1–0 win over Feronikeli that day, Shkëmbi stated that the club is in financial crisis and the presidency seek to put hands on the lineup. Shkëmbi eventually resigned on 19 May after guiding the team to a 5th-place finish.

Teuta Durrës
On 3 June 2018, Shkëmbi was announced as the new manager of Teuta Durrës for the 2018–19 season.

Career statistics

Club

International

Honours

Club
Besa Kavajë
 Albanian Cup: 2009–10

Skënderbeu Korçë
 Albanian Superliga: 2010–11, 2011–12, 2012–13, 2013–14, 2014–15, 2015–16
 Albanian Supercup: 2013, 2014

Individual
Albanian Superliga Fair Play Award: 2011–12
Albanian Superliga Player of the Month: December 2013

References

External links

FSHF profile
Profile and Stats at WhoScored.com
 

1979 births
Living people
Footballers from Korçë
Albanian footballers
Association football midfielders
Albania international footballers
Albania under-21 international footballers
Albania youth international footballers
KF Skënderbeu Korçë players
KF Teuta Durrës players
Ethnikos Asteras F.C. players
HNK Rijeka players
NK Kamen Ingrad players
FC Metalurh Zaporizhzhia players
FC Kryvbas Kryvyi Rih players
FK Partizani Tirana players
Besa Kavajë players
Kategoria Superiore players
Croatian Football League players
Ukrainian Premier League players
Albanian expatriate footballers
Albanian expatriate sportspeople in Greece
Albanian expatriate sportspeople in Croatia
Albanian expatriate sportspeople in Ukraine
Expatriate footballers in Greece
Expatriate footballers in Croatia
Expatriate footballers in Ukraine
KF Liria managers
KF Teuta Durrës managers
FK Dinamo Tirana managers
Kategoria Superiore managers
Albanian expatriate football managers
Expatriate football managers in Kosovo
Albanian expatriate sportspeople in Kosovo